Mary M. Cameron FRES is a medical entomologist in the United Kingdom. In 2019 she was the Professor of Medical Entomology at the London School of Hygiene and Tropical Medicine.

Education and career 
Cameron obtained a BSc in Zoology in 1983 from Bedford College (now Royal Holloway, University of London) and then a PhD in Entomology in 1987 from the University of London.

She was a postdoctoral researcher at the University of Oxford and then a research fellow at the Liverpool School of Tropical Medicine, before moving to the London School of Hygiene and Tropical Medicine in 1995 as a lecturer, where she is now Professor of Medical Entomology.

Research 

Cameron carries out field and laboratory research focusing on the surveillance and control of a wide range of vector-borne diseases, particularly leishmaniasis. She works internationally and she is a member of the World Health Organisation's Regional Technical Advisory Group focussing on Kala-azar disease elimination in South-East Asia.

She is editor of the Royal Entomological Society's journal Medical and Veterinary Entomology. In 2013 she co-edited a book Biological and Environmental Control of Disease Vectors published by the Centre for Agriculture and Bioscience International.

Cameron is cofounder and director of Vecotech, a spin-off company of the London School of Hygiene and Tropical Medicine.

External links 

 London School of Hygiene and Tropical Medicine profile

References 

Living people
Year of birth missing (living people)
British entomologists
Women entomologists
Fellows of the Royal Entomological Society
Alumni of Bedford College, London
Alumni of the University of London
Academics of the London School of Hygiene & Tropical Medicine
20th-century British scientists
20th-century British women scientists
21st-century British scientists
21st-century British women scientists